The 2010 Kor Royal Cup was the 75th Kor Royal Cup, an annual football match contested by the winners of the previous season's Thai Premier League and Thai FA Cup competitions.  The match was played at Suphachalasai Stadium, Bangkok, on 20 February 2010, and contested by 2009 Thai Premier League champions Muangthong United, and Thai Port as the winners of the 2009 Thai FA Cup.

Match

Summary

First half
Koné Mohamed made the goal with a header from Piyachart Tamaphan's right corner in 14th minute but it was not given because it was foul. In 16th minute Soumahoro Yaya made the goal too but it was offside.

Second half
Koné scored with a header from Piyachart's free kick in 67th minute, this is the first goal of Koné under Muangthong United shirt after moved from Chonburi. In 81st minute Dagno Siaka scored with a header.

The stampede

After Muangthong United scored the second goal, Thai Port's Pongpipat Kamnuan attempted to convince his fans that the last goal came from a handball, which angered Thai Port fans (the Khlong Toei Army). 

Thai Port fans agreed with him, and feeling that the second goal should have been disallowed, they started throwing firecrackers and bottles onto the pitch; a pitch invasion then occurred and angry Thai Port fans attacked fleeing Muangthong United fans (the Ultra Muangthong), Muangthong United players, officials and stadium security.

Details

Assistant referees:
 Preecha Kangram
 Wirote On-koke
Fourth official:
 Mongkolchai Pradsri

See also
2009 Thai Premier League
2009 Thai FA Cup

Kor
2010